Ashes and Embers is a 1982 American drama film directed by Haile Gerima and starring John Anderson.

Plot
Ashes and Embers is a two-hour film about the travails of black urban life. It is the story of a moody and disillusioned black veteran of the Vietnam War.

Cast
 John Anderson as Ned Charles
 Evelyn A. Blackwell as Grandma
 Norman Blalock as Jim
 Kathy Flewellen as Liza Jane
 Uwezo Flewellen as Kimathi
 Barry Wiggins as Randolph

Fellow filmmakers Billy Woodberry and Bernard Nicolas make brief cameo appearances in the film.

Awards and honors
In 1983, director Haile Gerima won the FIPRESCI Prize for Forum of New Cinema at the Berlin International Film Festival for Ashes and Embers.

References

External links
 

1982 films
American drama films
1982 drama films
Films directed by Haile Gerima
1980s English-language films
1980s American films